Councils of Tasmania are the 29 administrative districts of the Australian state of Tasmania. Local government areas (LGAs), more generally known as councils, are the tier of government responsible for the management of local duties such as road maintenance, town planning and waste management.

Local government regions
The local government areas of Tasmania are grouped into six regions:
 Central
 Hobart
 Launceston
 North-east
 North-west and west
 South-east

Local government areas
There are 29 local government areas of Tasmania:

Towns and suburbs of councils areas

The following is a list of councils areas grouped by region, and the major towns and suburbs within each LGA.

Hobart area councils
Greater Hobart contains six LGAs:
Brighton Council, containing the Hobart suburbs of Bridgewater, Gagebrook, Old Beach, and the towns of Brighton, Pontville, and Tea Tree.
City of Clarence, containing the Hobart suburbs of Acton, Bellerive, Cambridge, Clarendon Vale, Cremorne, Geilston Bay, Howrah, Lauderdale, Lindisfarne, Mornington, Opossum Bay, Otago, Risdon, Risdon Vale, Rokeby, Rose Bay, Rosny, Seven Mile Beach, South Arm, Tranmere, and Warrane; and the town of Richmond.
City of Glenorchy, containing the Hobart suburbs of Austins Ferry, Berriedale, Chigwell, Claremont, Collinsvale, Derwent Park, Dowsing Point, Glenlusk, Glenorchy, Goodwood, Granton, Lutana, Montrose, Moonah, Rosetta, and West Moonah.
City of Hobart, containing the Hobart suburbs of Battery Point, Dynnyrne, Fern Tree, Glebe, Hobart, Lenah Valley, Mount Nelson, Mount Stuart, New Town, North Hobart, Ridgeway, Sandy Bay, South Hobart, Tolmans Hill, and West Hobart.
 Kingborough Council, containing the Bruny Island suburbs of Adventure Bay, Alonnah, Apollo Bay, Barnes Bay, Dennes Point, Great Bay, Killora, Lunawanna, North Bruny, Simpsons Bay, and South Bruny; the Hobart suburbs of Blackmans Bay, Bonnet Hill, Howden, Huntingfield, Kingston, Kingston Beach, and Taroona; and the towns of Albion Heights, Allens Rivulet, Coningham, Cradoc, Electrona, Gordon, Kaoota, Kettering, Longley, Lucaston, Lower Longley, Margate, Neika, Oyster Cove, Pelverata, Sandfly, Snug, The Lea, Tinderbox, and Woodstock.
Sorell Council, containing the towns of Bream Creek, Carlton River, Connellys Marsh, Dodges Ferry, Copping, Dunalley, Kellevie, Lewisham, Marion Bay, Midway Point, Pawleena, Sorell, and Wattle Hill.

South-east area councils
The south-east area councils contains four LGAs:
 Derwent Valley Council, containing the towns and settlements of Adamsfield, Black Hills, Boyer, Bushy Park, Feilton, Fenton Forest, Fitzgerald, Glenfern, Glenora, Granton, Hayes, Karanja, Lachlan, Lawitta, Macquarie Plains, Magra, Malbina, Maydena, Molesworth, Moogara, Mount Field, Mount Lloyd, National Park, New Norfolk, Plenty, Rosegarland, Sorell Creek, Strathgordon, Tyenna, Upper Plenty, Uxbridge, and Westerway.
 Municipality of Tasman, containing the towns and settlements of Koonya, Murdunna, Nubeena, and Port Arthur.
 Huon Valley Council, containing the towns and settlements of Barretts Bay, Brooks Bay, Cairns Bay, Castle Forbes Bay, Charlotte Cove, Crabtree, Cradoc, Cygnet, Deep Bay, Dover, Eggs and Bacon Bay, Franklin, Garden Island Creek, Garden Island Sands, Gardners Bay, Geeveston, Glaziers Bay, Glen Huon, Glendevie, Golden Valley, Grove, Hastings, Huonville, Ida Bay, Judbury, Lonnavale, Lower Longley, Lower Wattle Grove, Lucaston, Lune River, Lymington, Mountain River, Nicholls Rivulet, Pelverata, Petcheys Bay, Police Point, Port Huon, Raminea, Randalls Bay, Ranelagh, Recherche, Strathblane, Surges Bay, Surveyors Bay, Upper Woodstock, Verona Sands, Wattle Grove, Woodstock Cygnet, Eggs and Bacon Bay, Dover, Franklin, Geeveston, Port Huon, Glen Huon, Huonville, and Southport. 
 Glamorgan Spring Bay Council, containing the towns and settlements of Bicheno, Coles Bay, Cranbrook, Orford, Swansea, and Triabunna.

North-east area councils
The north-east area councils contain three LGAs:
 Break O'Day Council, containing the towns and settlements of Chain of Lagoons, Falmouth, Fingal, St Helens, St Marys, and Scamander.
 Dorset Council, containing the towns and settlements of Branxholm, Bridport, Derby, Scottsdale, and Winnaleah.
 Flinders Council, containing Cape Barren Island and Flinders Island and its settlements of Emita and Whitemark.

Launceston area councils
The Launceston area councils contain four LGAs:
 George Town Council, containing the towns and settlements of Bell Bay, George Town and Mount Direction.
 City of Launceston, containing the  suburbs of East Launceston, Invermay, Kings Meadows, Launceston, Mayfield, Mowbray, Newnham, Newstead, Norwood, Punchbowl, Ravenswood, Rocherlea, South Launceston, St Leonards, Summerhill, Trevallyn, Waverley, West Launceston, and Youngtown; and the towns and settlements of Dilston, Lilydale, Relbia, Swan Bay, and Windermere.
 Meander Valley Council, containing the Launceston suburbs of Blackstone Heights,and Prospect Vale the towns and settlements of Birralee, Carrick, Deloraine, Dunorlan, Hagley, Hadspen, most of Liena, Mayberry, most of Mersey Forest, Mole Creek, Moltema, Montana, Needles, Parkham, Red Hills, half of Weegena, Weetah, Westbury, and Western Creek.
 West Tamar Council, containing the towns and settlements of Badger Head, Beaconsfield, Beauty Point, Bridgenorth, Deviot, Exeter, Flowery Gully, Gravelly Beach, Greens Beach, Holwell, Lanena, Legana, Loira, Riverside, Rosevears and Sidmouth.

North-west and west coast councils
The north-west and west coast councils contain nine LGAs:
 City of Burnie, containing the city of Burnie and its suburbs of Acton, Chasm Creek, Cooee, Downlands, East Ridgley, Emu Heights, Highclere, Mooreville, Ridgley, West Mooreville, and West Ridgley; and the towns and settlements of Brooklyn, Camdale, East Cam, Glance Creek, Hampshire, Havenview, Hillcrest, Montello, Natone, Ocean Vista, Park Grove, Parklands, Romaine, Round Hill, Shorewell Park, South Burnie, Stowport, Tewkesbury, Upper Burnie, Upper Natone, Upper Stowport, and Wivenhoe.
 Central Coast Council, containing the towns of Cuprona, Forth, Gawler, Howth, Penguin, Sulphur Creek, Turners Beach, Ulverstone, West Pine, West Ulverstone, and Upper Castra.
 Circular Head Council, containing the towns of Marrawah, Smithton, and Stanley; and the town and settlements of Black River, Edith Creek, Forest, Hellyer, Irishtown, Mawbanna, Mengha, Redpa, Rocky Cape, and Wiltshire. 
 City of Devonport, containing the city of Devonport and its suburbs of Ambleside, Don, East Devonport, Eugenana, Miandetta, Quoiba, Spreyton, Stony Rise, Paloona and Tugrah 
 Kentish Council, containing the towns and settlements of Acacia Hills, Cradle Mountain, part of Liena, part of Mersey Forest, Railton, Sheffield, and half of Weegena.
 King Island Council, containing King Island and the towns of Currie and Grassy.
 Latrobe Council, containing the towns and settlements of Harford, Hawley Beach, Latrobe, Moriarty, Port Sorell, Sassafras, and Shearwater.
 Waratah-Wynyard Council, containing the towns and settlements of Boat Harbour Beach, Calder, Mount Hicks, Myalla, Oldina, Preolenna, Savage River, Sisters Beach, Somerset, Waratah, and Wynyard.
West Coast Council, containing the towns and settlements of Queenstown, Rosebery, Strahan, Tullah, and Zeehan.

Central councils
The Central councils contain three LGAs:
Central Highlands Council, containing the settlements of Bothwell, Bronte Park, Derwent Bridge, Hamilton, Liawenee, Miena, Ouse, and Tarraleah.
Northern Midlands Council, containing the settlements of Avoca, Campbell Town, Cressy, Evandale, Liffey, Longford, and Perth.
Southern Midlands Council, containing the settlements of Bagdad, Campania, Oatlands, and Ross.

Former local government areas

Tasmania has had a number of former local government areas. In 1907, the 149 road trusts or town boards (LGAs) of Tasmania were reduced by mergers and amalgamations to 53 LGAs. By the time of a large scale overhaul in 1993, 46 LGAs were reduced to the present-day 29.

See also

 List of localities in Tasmania
 Government of Tasmania

References

External links 
 

 
Local government
Regions of Tasmania